Oderwerke or Stettiner Oderwerke was a German shipbuilding company, located in Stettin.

History

Oderwerke was founded on January 28, 1903 and built 154 ships prior to World War I.

After the war, Oderwerke moved first to Lübeck in 1949 and later Cologne in 1950. The company was declared bankrupt in 1961 and closed.

Ships built by Oderwerke (selection)

Civilian ships
 SS Preussen (1909)
 SS Stettin (1933)
 SS Isa (1936)
 Wal (1938)

Naval ships

Submarines (U-boats)
 2 x Type VII submarines (1941–1944)

External links

 Some history of Oderwerke
 

Shipbuilding companies of Germany
Vehicle manufacturing companies established in 1903
Defunct companies of Germany
History of Szczecin
Vehicle manufacturing companies disestablished in 1961